House in the Sun (French: La maison au soleil) is a 1929 French silent film directed by Gaston Roudès and starring France Dhélia, Gaston Jacquet and Georges Melchior.

Cast
 France Dhélia as Madeleine 
 Gaston Jacquet as Marcel Pignaire 
 Georges Melchior as Gérard Göel 
 Annie Grazia as Janic 
 Jane Loury
 Henri Bosc

References

Bibliography
 Robert B. Connelly. The Silents: Silent Feature Films, 1910-36, Volume 40, Issue 2. December Press, 1998.

External links

1929 films
Films directed by Gaston Roudès
French silent feature films
French black-and-white films
1920s French films